USS Spartan (SP-336) was a minesweeper that served in the United States Navy from 1917 to 1919.
 
Spartan was built as a commercial tug of the same name in 1912 by the Skinner Shipbuilding and Dry Dock Company at Baltimore, Maryland. On 27 April 1917, the U.S. Navy acquired her from her owners, the H. & N.Y. Transportation Company of New York City, for naval use during World War I. She was commissioned as USS Spartan (SP-336) on 22 September 1917.

Assigned to the 3rd Naval District, Spartan spent the next two years on minesweeping duty in the New York City area. On 20 September 1919, she was returned to H. & N.Y. Transportation; her name subsequently was stricken from the Navy List.

As of ca. February 2008, Spartans hulk was photographed still afloat at Donjon Marine Yard (formally Whitte Brothers Marine Scrap Yard) at Rossville, Staten Island, New York.

Notes

References

Department of the Navy Naval History and Heritage Command Online Library of Selected Images: Civilian Ships: Spartan (American Tug, 1912). Served in 1917–1919 as USS Spartan (SP-336)
NavSource Online: Section Patrol Craft Photo Archive: Spartan (SP 336)

Minesweepers of the United States Navy
World War I minesweepers of the United States
Ships built in Baltimore
1912 ships